"Amnesia" is a song by industrial band KMFDM from their album WTF?!  It was released as a single on 22 May 2012 in North America and on 25 May 2012 in Europe.

Reception
"Amnesia" has been favorably described as "highly danceable", a "club buster",  and a "hellish groover".

Artwork
The cover image for the single was designed by long-time KMFDM associate Aidan "Brute!" Hughes.  It was initially conceived by band leader Sascha Konietzko, and is inspired by the Edvard Munch painting The Scream.

Track listing

References

KMFDM songs
2012 songs
2012 singles
Songs written by Sascha Konietzko
Songs written by Lucia Cifarelli